The Girl Guides Association of Bahrain (GGAB) is the national Guiding organization of Bahrain. Guiding was introduced to Bahrain in 1970 and the association became a member of the World Association of Girl Guides and Girl Scouts (WAGGGS) in 1981. The girls-only organization has 1,556 members (as of 2003).

The Girl Guide emblem incorporates elements of the flag of Bahrain.

Program 
The association is divided in for sections:
 Brownie - ages 7 to 11
 Guides - ages 12 to 15
 Senior Guides - ages 16 to 18
 Ranger Guides - ages 18 to 23

References

Further reading 
 World Association of Girl Guides and Girl Scouts, World Bureau (1997), Trefoil Round the World. Eleventh Edition 1997.

See also 
 Boy Scouts of Bahrain

1970 establishments in Bahrain
World Association of Girl Guides and Girl Scouts member organizations
Scouting and Guiding in Bahrain
Youth organizations established in 1970